Kjeragfossen is a waterfall in the municipality of Sandnes in Rogaland county, Norway.  The  waterfall cascades down from the Kjerag plateau on the south shore of the Lysefjorden.  It is one of the highest waterfalls in Norway and one of the highest in the world.  It is a plunge-style waterfall that is usually only active about 5 months of the year. The waterfall is located in a very scenic area that has many tourists each year.  The famous Kjeragbolten boulder is located nearby.

See also
List of waterfalls by height
List of waterfalls of Norway

References

External links
Pictures of the waterfall

Waterfalls of Rogaland
Tourist attractions in Rogaland
Sandnes